"Handsomer" is a song by American rapper Russ. It was released on February 4, 2022, through Russ's Diemon label. The song sees Russ boasting about how his wealth makes him more handsome than he already is. A remix was released on March 9, 2022, featuring rapper Ktlyn's verse, which she had uploaded to the video-sharing app TikTok and went viral.

Background
"Handsomer" was first previewed by Russ on January 9, 2022, when he posted a video on social media of him listening to the song. It was released a week later as part of Russ's weekly song releases which he resumed in January 2022. He promoted the track by dueting with creators on TikTok, initiating an "open verse" challenge where users could add their own verse. Rapper Ktlyn responded with her verse, which eventually appeared on the official remix after it garnered popularity. On the song, Russ raps about how money makes him more charming. Paul Duong of Rap Radar deemed it an "expensive" track, noting how "Russ boasts his paper and watches out for the women who are only intrigued by his wealth". HotNewHipHops Alexander Cole called it a "banger", and noted that "Handsomer" is atypical to Russ's previous love song releases, as he appears "unabashedly braggadocios" on the song. Cole said the song's title "makes for a nice use" of a non-existent word, while further complimenting the beat as "catchy", and Russ's flows as "solid, as always".

Charts

Weekly charts

Year-end charts

Certifications

References

2022 songs
2022 singles
Russ (rapper) songs